The Non-Proliferation Trust (NPT) is a U.S. nonprofit organization that, at the beginning of the 21st century, advocated storing 10,000 tons of U.S. nuclear waste in Russia for a fee of $15 billion paid to the Russian government and $250 million paid to a fund for Russian orphans. The group was headed by Admiral Daniel Murphy. This proposal was endorsed by the Russian atomic energy ministry, MinAtom, which estimated that the proposal could eventually generate $150 billion in revenue for Russia.

See also
 Halter Marine
 Federal Agency on Atomic Energy (Russia)

References

Energy economics
Non-profit organizations based in the United States
Radioactive waste
Environment of Russia